The 2021–22 season was the 52nd campaign of the Scottish Basketball Championship, the national basketball league of Scotland. There was no 2020–21 season due to the global coronavirus pandemic. 16 teams were split across Division 1, featuring 9 teams, and Division 2, featuring 7 teams.

Division 1

Teams

Promoted from 2019-20 Division 2
 Stirling Knights
 West Lothian Wolves

League table

*West Lothian Wolves deducted 1 point due to failure to fulfil fixture vs. Falkirk Fury on 02 April 2022.

Playoffs
Semi-finals

Final

Division 2

Teams

New teams
 Ayr Storm
 Dundee Madsons
 Edusport Academy
 Renfrew Rocks
 Tayside Musketeers

League table

Scottish Cup
Scottish Cup (basketball)

First Round

Second Round

Quarter-finals

Semi-finals

Final

References

Scottish Basketball Championship Men seasons
Scotland
Scotland
basketball
basketball